All India Radio Monitoring Service (AIRMS) is the central monitoring service that monitors broadcasts in India as well as from all foreign broadcasts of interest to India. AIRMS is located in Simla. It works in liaison with R&AW and Military intelligence.

References

Indian intelligence agencies
Mass media monitoring
Government agencies with year of establishment missing
Domestic intelligence agencies